Merrifield may refer to:

Places
 Merrifield, Minnesota, US
 Merrifield, Virginia, US
 Merrifield, a village in Devon, England
 Merrifield Children's Unit, a former psychiatric institution in Somerset, England
 Merrifield, a residential development in the City of Hume (northern fringe of Melbourne) in Victoria, Australia

People

Other uses
 Merrifield (system on chip), code name for an Intel Atom system on chip platform

See also
 :Category:Merrifield family